The Shire of Waggamba was a local government area of Queensland, Australia on the Queensland-New South Wales border in the Darling Downs region, surrounding the Town of Goondiwindi, a separate local government area limited to the town.

History 

The Waggamba Division was created on 11 November 1879 as one of 74 divisions around Queensland under the Divisional Boards Act 1879 with a population of 1176. Its headquarters were in the town of Goondiwindi.

In 1888, the urban area of Goondiwindi was excised from the Waggamba Division to create a separate municipality, the Borough of Goondiwindi.

With the passage of the Local Authorities Act 1902, Waggamba Division became the Shire of Waggamba on 31 March 1903.

On 15 March 2008, under the Local Government (Reform Implementation) Act 2007 passed by the Parliament of Queensland on 10 August 2007, the Shire of Waggamba merged with the Shire of Inglewood and Town of Goondiwindi to form the Goondiwindi Region.

Towns and localities 

The Shire of Waggamba included the following settlements:

Towns:
 Bungunya
 Daymar
 Kurumbul
 Talwood
 Toobeah
 Yelarbon
State forests:
 Calingunee State Forest
 Kerimbilla State Forest

Localities:
 Billa Billa
 Callandoon
 Calingunee
 Kerimbilla
 Kindon
 Lundavra
 Moonie
 Tarawera
 Weengallon
 Wondalli
 Wyaga

Population

Chairmen

 April 1890 – April 1900: William James Hooper
 May 1900 – 1901: G.W. Watson
 1901 – May 1905: Harry Marshall
 1905 – April 1907: Donald Gunn
 April 1907 – April 1908: J. Gore
 April 1908 – : Richard Hugo Treweeke
 1927: Donald Weir Oliver McIntyre

References

Further reading

External links

 

Former local government areas of Queensland
Goondiwindi Region
Darling Downs
1879 establishments in Australia
2008 disestablishments in Australia
Populated places disestablished in 2008